Anil Charanjeett, also known as Anil Mange, is an Indian Bollywood film actor who has worked in films like PK, Singh Is Bling, Raees and Hasee Toh Phasee. He gave a special appearance in the song "Main Badhiya Tu Bhi Badhiya" from the movie Sanju.

Background
Anil charanjeett comes from Balaghat in Madhya Pradesh. After graduating in commerce, he joined Whistling Woods International Institute in Mumbai. Mange's father was a businessman who wanted Mange to join the family business, but he chose to go into acting instead.

Filmography

References

External links 

 
 
 

1983 births
Living people
Indian male film actors
Male actors in Hindi cinema